Goran Kapetanović, born 12 December 1974 in Sarajevo, Bosnia and Herzegovina, is a Bosnian-Swedish writer, director, and adjunct in film directing at Malmö Theater Academy.

Kapetanović was trained at the Stockholm Academy of Dramatic Arts and has directed short films such as Flykting 532 (2015), Kiruna-Kigali (2012), En familj (2004), and Eko (2004), as well as features such as Min Faster in Sarajevo (2016) and Krig (2017). He directed all eight episodes of the TV series Caliphate (2020).

Kapetanović has received more than 20 international prizes from a variety of cities and festivals. For Kiruna-Kigali, he won best short film at the Toronto Short Film Festival and was shortlisted for the Academy Awards 2013. For Min Faster i Sarajevo, Kapetanović received six nominations and won for best director at Guldbaggen in Sweden.

References

1974 births
Living people
Bosnia and Herzegovina film producers
Film people from Sarajevo